Bartholomew de Burghersh may refer to:

 Bartholomew de Burghersh, 1st Baron Burghersh (died 1355), English nobleman and official
 Bartholomew de Burghersh, 2nd Baron Burghersh (died 1369), son of the above, English nobleman and soldier and Knight of the Garter